The Union for the Progress of Guinea is an opposition political party in Guinea. In the parliamentary election held on 30 June 2002, the party won 4.1% of the popular vote and 3 out of 114 seats.

The UPG was led for years by Jean-Marie Doré, who unsuccessfully ran for President in 1993 and 1998.  It held one position in the government of Prime Minister Ahmed Tidiane Souaré, which was appointed on June 19, 2008.

References

Political parties in Guinea